Robert Graf may refer to:

 Robert Graf (actor) (1923–1966), German actor 
 Robert Graf (canoeist) (1906–1988), American Olympic canoer
 Robert Graf (politician) (1929–1996), Austrian politician